In electronics, switching frequency refers to the rate at which an electronic switch performs its function. Switching frequency is an important design and operating parameter in systems such as:

 The Class-D amplifier, an audio power amplifier with a switched-mode output.
 Various types of electric power conversion equipment:
 Boost converter
 Buck–boost converter
 Buck converter
 Chopper
 Switched-mode power supply
 Power inverter
 Motor controls, such as Variable-frequency drives

Electrical parameters
This frequency is also used in different types of DC-DC converters like Battery Discharge Regulator, Universal Bus Regulator, Auxiliary Bus Regulator etc., switching frequency refers the switch on or off the circuit in the particular frequency